Neil Lewis Chayet (January 17, 1939 – August 11, 2017) was an American lawyer and radio personality.

He was known for his weekday feature program Looking at the Law (debuting April 1, 1976, on WBZ).

Early life and education
Chayet graduated from Tufts University (B.A. 1960) and the Harvard Law School (J.D. 1963).

Career
Chayet worked on several high-profile cases, including the Boston Strangler. As president of Chayet Communications Group, Inc., he maintained an active legal and consulting practice in the area of health law. He acted as special counsel to several law firms in Boston and Washington, D.C., and lectured on Legal Medicine in the Department of Psychiatry, Harvard Medical School, and as an adjunct professor at Tufts, where he also served on the Board of Trustees from 1971 to 1981.

Having been active in Massachusetts law and politics for most of his life, he also served as Vice President of the Boston Republican Committee. In this capacity he worked to clear the way for Mitt Romney's 2002 run for Governor.

Personal life
Neil Chayet was married to Susan Chayet; they had three children (Michael, Lisa, and Ely). He later married Martha M. Chayet. After buying the Joseph Story House in 2006, they moved from Manchester-by-the-Sea to Salem.

Upon his retirement in June 2017, Chayet announced he would undergo treatment for an aggressive cancer. He died on Friday,  August 11, 2017, aged 78.

Selected publications
 Social and Legal Aspects of LSD Usage. In: LSD, Man & Society (1967), p. 94-126
 Legal Implications of Emergency Care (1969). 
 Neil Chayet’s Looking at the law (1981). 
 Interview with John Koch, The Boston Globe (1999)

References

External links
 Looking at the law – audio files via WBZ (AM)

1939 births
2017 deaths
Massachusetts lawyers
Harvard Medical School faculty
People from Salem, Massachusetts
Harvard Law School alumni
Massachusetts Republicans
Tufts University faculty
20th-century American Jews
Deaths from cancer in Massachusetts
Tufts University alumni
20th-century American lawyers
21st-century American Jews